Saints and animal/plant life. A number of Christian saints have anecdotes and stories about them in relation to animals or plants. In some cases they appeared to possess miraculous powers to speak with animals.

Among examples of such supposed stories include the following.

Anselm of Canterbury

A group of dogs were pursuing a hare and the hare run under this horse as he was riding it. The dogs stopped and the hare continued. Anselm thought the hare reminded him of a poor soul about to die that is surrounded by devils waiting to carry away their prey. And Anselm then forbade the dogs to continue pursuing the hare, and the dogs obeyed and left the hare in peace.

Columba of Iona

Columba, while living on the island of Iona, once supposedly called one of the other monks to him and told him that a heron would arrive in two days on the west side of the island, having flown there from Ireland. And he instructed the monk to go there and take the bird, bringing it back with him to feed it and take care of it for three days as a pilgrim.  And after three days it would be ready to leave again, to go back to Ireland. And it all happened as Columba predicted, and the monk found the weak and hungry bird on the shore, took care of it, and released it again after three days.

Like the story of Anselm with the hare representing a sinner on the point of death, it is possible that the heron was also like the penitents who came from Ireland to Iona to do penance and revive their souls, so they could later go back to where they came from with new spiritual life.

Another story involving Columba is that there was a fruit tree near the monastery of Durrow in Ireland that was connected to Columba's monastery in Iona. The fruit was plentiful, but it was always bitter. When Columba came to Durrow on one occasion, he came to the tree and blessed it, saying 'In the name of almighty God, all your bitterness shall leave you, O bitter tree, and your fruit until now most bitter shall become most sweet.' And after he did this, the fruit of the tree supposedly did become sweet.

He encountered a very large boar being pursued by hunting dogs in Skye and said 'Go no further, but die where you are now' and after he said this, the boar dropped dead.

Shortly before he died, he supposedly blessed the island of Iona by saying that 'From this hour, from this instant, all poisons of snakes shall have no power to harm either men or cattle in the lands of this island for as long as the people who dwell here keep Christ's commandments'.

A monk named Molua Ua Briúin asked Columba to bless a butchering knife for him, and Columba blessed it without realizing what it was. When he later learned that it was a butchering knife he said, 'I trust in my Lord, that the implement I have blessed will harm neither man nor beast'. And when this knife was later used to slaughter cows, the knife was incapable of cutting the cows' flesh and could not even penetrate the skin. This knife was then melted down and the metal for it was put on all the metal implements used at the monastery of Iona.

He also supposedly encountered a monster in the River Ness, which he turned back by blessing it. This later was linked to the Loch Ness monster legend.

Florentius

In Gregory the Great's dialogues, there is recorded the story of two monks named Florentius and Euthicius. When a certain deacon came to visit Florentius, the area around his cell was filled with snakes and Florentius then prayed to God to get rid of the snakes, and suddenly lightning came down and killed them all, and when Florentius then asked God what should happen with their bodies, at the same moment a large number of birds came to eat their corpses

Francis of Assisi

In his famous Canticle of the Sun, he referred to other creatures as his brothers and sisters. He tamed a wolf in the city of Gubbio and made an agreement with the wolf that the wolf would stop terrorizing the town, and in return the people would feed it (see Wolf of Gubbio).

He also famously preached to birds and called for food to be given out to animals on Christmas Day.

Francis of Paola

He had a pet trout named 'Antonella'. A visiting priest, who didn't realize it was special, caught it and brought it back to cook it. When Francis realized what happened he sent word to the priest, and the priest annoyed by Francis' concern over the trout (that had now been cooked), threw it on the ground. The dead and cooked trout was brought back to Francis, and he put its remains back in water and called on God saying 'Antonella, in the name of Charity, return to life' and the trout then resurrected with its restored body and swam in the pool like before.

St Gall

St Gall, when on mission in Switzerland, once came across a bear that charged him, but he rebuked the bear. The bear then changed its behaviour and helped to gather firewood for St Gall and was a companion to him for the rest of his days.

Jerome

He supposedly healed a lion in the wilderness by removing a thorn from its paw, and the lion was then tamed and followed him around.

Jesus Christ

In the gospel, Jesus curses a fig tree after he finds no figs on it, even though it was not the season for figs. After he curses it, the tree withers and Jesus tells His disciples that whatever they ask for in prayer will be given to them, even if they should say to a mountain to be lifted up and go into the sea, it would obey them.

The fig tree has often been thought to represent the people of Israel, who were not producing 'good fruit'.

St Patrick

In Irish legends, Patrick supposedly banished snakes from Ireland.

Paul of Tarsus

When on the island of Malta, he could pick up poisonous snakes without being bitten. At the end of Mark's gospel, Jesus told his disciples that they would perform this sign. Some have contested whether the final verses of Mark's gospel were original or a later addition, however.

In recent years, some Pentecostal churches in the United States have claimed to replicate this miracle, believing it to be a sign of the Holy Spirit's presence. However, some have also been bitten and hospitalized or even died as a result of attempting this  (see Snake handling)

References

Groups of Christian saints
Miracles
Christianity and nature